Lynne Warring (born 1 December 1963) is a former association football player who represented New Zealand at international level.

Warring scored on her Football Ferns debut in an 11–0 win over a Papua New Guinea on 21 May 1991 and ended her international career with 4 caps and 1 goals to her credit.

Warring represented New Zealand at the Women's World Cup finals in China in 1991 making a single appearance at the finals in their 1–4 loss to China.

References

External links

1963 births
Living people
New Zealand women's international footballers
New Zealand women's association footballers
1991 FIFA Women's World Cup players
Women's association football midfielders